Virtual Reality (Total Escapism) is an album by American jazz saxophonist Oliver Lake, which was recorded in 1991 and released on the Gazell label.

Reception 

In his review for AllMusic, Scott Yanow states "Oliver Lake is heard throughout at the top of his game, making this both an easily recommended set for his fans and a perfect introduction to his dynamic music."

The Penguin Guide to Jazz says "This was Lake's working quartet and perhaps the most pungent band he'd had for a decade.. A fine album."

Track listing 
All compositions by Oliver Lake except where noted.
 "Jesus Christ" (Curtis Clark) – 4:46
 "Fables of Faubus" (Charles Mingus) – 8:29
 "The Prophet" (Eric Dolphy) – 8:39
 "Shedetude" (Bobby Bradford) – 5:20
 "Pop a Wheelie" – 8:54
 "Handful of Fives" (Roland Kirk) – 9:40
 "Virtual Reality (Total Escapism)" – 7:03
 "Jest a Little" – 8:00

Personnel 
Oliver Lake – alto saxophone, soprano saxophone
Anthony Peterson – guitar
Santi Debriano – bass
Pheeroan akLaff – drums

References 

1992 albums
Oliver Lake albums
albums produced by Samuel Charters